Henry Rabe Canoy (November 1, 1923 – May 16, 2008) was a Filipino businessman and founder of Radio Mindanao Network.

Canoy was born in Cagayan de Oro, Misamis Oriental into a family of teachers and traders.

In 1952, Canoy started the DXCC, the first radio station in Cagayan de Oro. Canoy wanted to use radio for public broadcasting to inform, educate and also entertain listeners. Up until this time the main source of news for most Filipinos came from Manila based newspapers. 
Canoy went on to open up many more local radio stations throughout the Philippines, together these stations formed the Radio Mindanao Network.

In 2002, Philippine President Gloria Macapagal Arroyo praised Canoy for his achievements in and contributions to broadcast journalism. After Canoy's death President Arroyo released a statement praising his legacy,

Personal life
He was married to Maria Clara Suniel-Canoy. He has six children, respectively Eric, Rebecca, Ike aka "Butch", Charley, Tessa and Harriet.

His brother, Nestor Rabe Canoy (1927-2017), was a Renowned Radiation Oncologist at the Ellis Fischel State Cancer Hospital in Columbia, Missouri and was in Private Practice as well.

References

Canoy obituary
Canoy obituary
Sunstar story on President Arroyo's statement on Canoy

External links
Radio Mindanao Network

1923 births
2008 deaths
People from Cagayan de Oro
20th-century Filipino businesspeople